William Shawn McKnight (born June 26, 1968) is an American prelate of the Roman Catholic Church who has been serving as bishop of the Diocese of Jefferson City in Missouri since 2017.

Biography

Early life 
William Shawn McKnight was born June 26, 1968 in Wichita, Kansas, and grew up in a large Catholic family. McKnight’s father, also named William McKnight, was killed in a boating accident along with his grandfather and uncle. William Shawn McKnight was 18 months old at the time of the accident. His mother, Mary, married Gary Schaeffer and they had 7 children, one girl and six boys.  Four of McKnight’s brothers served in the U.S. military, and he was an Air Force chaplain during the summer of his deacon year.

McKnight earned a degree in biochemistry from the University of Dallas in 1990. He entered the seminary and completed his ecclesiastical studies in 1994. He has a Master of Theology degree and a Master of Divinity degree from the Pontifical College Josephinum Seminary in Columbus, Ohio. He attended the Pontifical Athenaeum of St. Anselm in Rome where he specialized in sacramental theology and earned a Licentiate in Sacred Theology in 1999 and a Doctor of Sacred Theology degree in 2001.

Priesthood 
McKnight was ordained a priest by Bishop Eugene John Gerber  on May 28, 1994 for the Diocese of Wichita. From 1994 to 1997, he served as the parish vicar at Blessed Sacrament Parish in Wichita. In 1999, he was appointed as parish administrator for Saint Patrick Parish in Chanute, Kansas. At Newman University in Wichita, McKnight served as the chaplain and as an adjunct professor in 2000 and 2001.  He also was assigned as pastor of Saint Mark the Evangelist Parish in Colwich, Kansas from 2000 to 2003. 

From 2000 to 2005, McKnight served as diocesan director of divine worship, as a diocesan consultor and as a member of the presbyteral council. He returned to the Josephinum to the following positions

 Director of liturgy from 2003 to 2007
 Assistant professor from 2003 to 2008, 
 Dean of students from 2004 to 2006 
 Director of formation from 2006 to 2007 
 Vice-president for development and alumni relations from 2007 to 2008 

McKnight was pastor at Blessed Sacrament in Wichita from 2008 to 2010.

From 2010 until 2015, McKnight served in the USCCB’s Secretariat for Clergy, Consecrated Life and Vocations. This position provides leadership and guidance to priests in their ministry, assists the Bishops’ Committee on Child and Youth Protection, and addresses priesthood concerns with the public. After completing his term at the USCCB, McKnight was appointed pastor of Magdalen Parish in Wichita. He served as pastor there from 2015 to 2018.

Bishop of Jefferson City 
Pope Francis appointed McKnight bishop of the Diocese of Jefferson City on November 21, 2017. McKnight was the fifth bishop to come from the Diocese of Wichita since 1998. He was consecrated on February 6, 2018.

Science in the seminary 
McKnight is part of the planning team for a project funded by the John Templeton Foundation at John Carroll University to re-engage science in the seminary. The team states their efforts will “allow Roman Catholic seminarians and clergy to engage the bigger questions of science that are naturally a part of theological inquiry and pertinent to contemporary Christians who live in a world deeply influenced, if not dominated, by science and technology.”

Diaconate knowledge: author, teacher, speaker 
McKnight wrote a dissertation on the permanent diaconate under the guidance of Father James Puglisi, a Franciscan Friar of the Atonement and the director of the Ecumenical Center in Rome studying sacramental theology. The Deacon Reader and The Newman Review have published some of McKnight’s diaconate writings. The NADD, the National Diaconate Institute for Continuing Education and other diaconate programs have invited McKnight to be a speaker at their gatherings.

In 2005, McKnight taught a class at the Josephinum called “The Latin Rite Deacon”. St. Meinrad Permanent Deacon Formation Program in Indiana had a class called “Theology of the Deacon” instructed by McKnight from 2005 to 2010.

McKnight is the author of Understanding the Diaconate. The book is published by the Catholic University of America Press  and states, “Understanding the diaconate adds the resources of sociology and anthropology to the theological sources of scripture, liturgy, patristic era texts, theologians, and magisterial teachings to conclude that the deacon can be understood as "social intermediary and symbol of communities" who serves the participation of the laity in the life and mission of the Church. This research proposes the deacon as a servant of the bond of communion within the Church (facilitating the relationship between the bishop or priest and his people), and between the People of God and the individual in need.”

See also

 Catholic Church hierarchy
 Catholic Church in the United States
 Historical list of the Catholic bishops of the United States
 List of Catholic bishops of the United States
 Lists of patriarchs, archbishops, and bishops

References

External links
Profile on Roman Catholic Diocese of Jefferson City

 

1968 births
Living people
People from Wichita, Kansas
Roman Catholic bishops of Jefferson City
Roman Catholic Diocese of Wichita
Catholics from Kansas
21st-century Roman Catholic bishops in the United States
Bishops appointed by Pope Francis